Noiseworks is the debut album by Australian rock band, Noiseworks. It was released by CBS Records in June 19, 1987. The album peaked at No. 6 on the Kent Music Report Albums Chart, with the introduction of the ARIA Album Charts in the beginning of 1988, the album was still in the charts at No. 37. Noiseworks sold more than 210,000 copies (3× platinum) in Australia.

Track listing

Personnel

Musicians 
 Steve Balbi – bass
 Stuart Fraser – guitar
 Kevin Nicol – drums
 Justin Stanley – keyboards
 Jon Stevens – vocals

Production 
 Mastering – Leon Zervos
 Engineer – Alan Wright
 Assistant engineers – Heidi Cannavo, John Darwish, Mark Roberts, Paul Kosky, Paula Jones
 Photography – Gary Heery
 Produced – Mark Opitz

Charts

Certifications

References 

1987 debut albums
Noiseworks albums
albums produced by Mark Opitz